Juma Mosque of Ganja or Friday Mosque of Ganja is a mosque located in the centre of Ganja, Azerbaijan. The mosque was built in 1606, according to a project of Sheykh Baheddin Mohammad Amili. The mosque is also often called “Shah Abbas Mosque” because it was built on the instructions of Shah Abbas the Great during his reign.

In 1776, two minarets were attached to the mosque. The mosque was built of red brick, which was traditional for Ganja. There was functioned a madrasah at the mosque for a long time, where the eminent Azerbaijani poet and scientist Mirza Shafi Vazeh taught at that time.

In 2008, the building of the mosque was totally reconstructed. Old Russian bonds put into an envelope had been found during the reconstruction.  This finding helped to draw out a conclusion that the last construction works had been held in 1910, but not in the end of the 18th century, during the Javad Khan’s reign, as it was considered earlier.

See also
Shah Abbas Mosque, Yerevan

References

17th-century mosques
Safavid architecture
Mosques in Azerbaijan
Persian-Caucasian architecture
Buildings and structures in Ganja, Azerbaijan
Tourist attractions in Ganja, Azerbaijan
1606 establishments in Iran
Ganja
Mosques completed in 1606
Mosques completed in 1776